Definity may refer to:
Definity (film recorder)
Avaya Definity, the Avaya Definity PBX
Perflutren, with the trade name Definity, is a type of microbubble contrast agent
Definity Inc., financial company and owns several insurance companies.